The 2022 World Wheelchair Mixed Doubles Curling Championship was held from April 30 to May 5 at the Kisakallio Sports Institute in Lohja, Finland. It was the first time the World Wheelchair Mixed Doubles Curling Championship was ever held.

Sabina Johansson and Marcus Holm of Sweden beat Rita Sárai and Viktor Beke of Hungary in the final and won the first ever World Wheelchair Mixed Doubles title. Rikke Iversen and Rune Lorentsen of Norway took home the bronze medals after they defeated Orietta Bertò and Paolo Ioratti of Italy in the bronze medal game.

Medallists

Teams
The teams are as follows:

Round robin standings
Final Round Robin Standings

Round robin results

All draw times are listed in Eastern European Summer Time (UTC+03:00).

Draw 1
Saturday, April 30, 9:30

Draw 2
Saturday, April 30, 13:00

Draw 3
Saturday, April 30, 16:30

Draw 4
Saturday, April 30, 20:00

Draw 5
Sunday, May 1, 9:30

Draw 6
Sunday, May 1, 13:00

Draw 7
Sunday, May 1, 16:30

Draw 8
Sunday, May 1, 20:00

Draw 9
Monday, May 2, 9:30

Draw 10
Monday, May 2, 13:00

^ ran out of time, and therefore forfeited the match.

Draw 11
Monday, May 2, 16:30

Draw 12
Monday, May 2, 20:00

Draw 13
Tuesday, May 3, 9:30

Draw 14
Tuesday, May 3, 13:00

Draw 15
Tuesday, May 3, 16:30

Draw 16
Tuesday, May 3, 20:00

Draw 17
Wednesday, May 4, 9:30

Draw 18
Wednesday, May 4, 13:00

Playoffs

Qualification Games
Wednesday, May 4, 20:00

Semifinals
Thursday, May 5, 10:00

Bronze medal match
Thursday, May 5, 16:00

Final
Thursday, May 5, 16:00

Final standings
Source:

References

External links

Video (coverage on YouTube channel "Curling Finland")
 
 
 
 
 
 
 
 
 
 
 
 
 
 
 
 
 
 
 
 
 

World Wheelchair Mixed Doubles Curling Championship
World Wheelchair Mixed Doubles Curling
World Wheelchair Mixed Doubles Curling
World Wheelchair Mixed Doubles Curling Championship
Sports competitions in Lohja
International curling competitions hosted by Finland